Lepidargyrus is a genus of plant bugs in the family Miridae. There are about 14 described species in Lepidargyrus.

Species
These 14 species belong to the genus Lepidargyrus:

 Lepidargyrus ancorifer (Fieber, 1858)
 Lepidargyrus fasciatus Konstantinov, 2008
 Lepidargyrus hafezi Linnavuori & Hosseini, 1998
 Lepidargyrus ibericus (Wagner, 1957)
 Lepidargyrus instabilis (Reuter, 1878)
 Lepidargyrus iranicus Muminov, 1962
 Lepidargyrus lividus (Reuter, 1894)
 Lepidargyrus muminovi (Josifov, 1973)
 Lepidargyrus nigerrimus Linnavuori, 1998
 Lepidargyrus pollinosus (Horvath, 1906)
 Lepidargyrus putshkovi Drapolyuk, 1993
 Lepidargyrus seidenstueckeri (Wagner, 1956)
 Lepidargyrus senguni (Wagner, 1956)
 Lepidargyrus syriacus (Wagner, 1956)

References

Further reading

 
 
 
 

Phylini
Articles created by Qbugbot